Jon Byron Rankin (born 9 February 1982) is an American born retired Caymanian middle and long-distance track and field runner. The highlight of his track and field career was winning the USA Junior Outdoor Track & Field Championships at 1500 metres and the 2007 Emsley Carr Mile in England. He is the CEO of Go Be More, who design apparel. He is also a copywriter working for various organisations and for himself.

Early life and amateur career

Rankin graduated from Monte Vista High School in Spring Valley, California. He then went on to attend the University of California, Los Angeles (UCLA) where he studied for a Bachelor of Arts degree in English language. In 2004 he became UCLA's number one runner for the season and was an All-American. On 9 April 2005, he became then the 17th African American and 268th American overall to run a sub four-minute mile. He graduated from UCLA in 2005.

Professional career

Athletics career
After graduating, he turned professional as a sponsored athlete with Nike. Rankin trained and raced throughout the US and Europe. On 11 August 2007 he won the Emsley Carr Mile in Manchester, England in a personal best time of 3:54.24, A year later in 2008, at the time of the United States Olympic Trials, he was diagnosed with focal segmental glomerulosclerosis (FSGS), although his official diagnosis didn't come about until the end of 2008. FSGS is estimated to occur in 2-3 persons per million, with males and African peoples at higher risk. Later in 2011, Rankin underwent an experimental stem cell surgery to reverse his disease.

Earlier, on 1 October 2009, Rankin decided to switch his allegiance to the Cayman Islands, "Jon is eligible to do this because both of his parents were born in the Cayman Islands," wrote his manager, Merhawi Keflezighi. He retired from professional competitive racing at the end of 2012. In 2015 Rankin was inducted into the National Black Distance Running Hall of Fame by the National Black Marathoners’ Association.

Personal bests

All Information taken from World Athletics profile.

Competitions

Career outside of athletics

Since graduating, outside of athletics, Rankin has been a freelance senior copywriter, and since 2018 he has been the chief executive officer of both Go Be More and Catchy Content Co.

See also
List of Caymanian records in athletics

References

External links
Go Be More profile of Jon Rankin

1982 births
Living people
Track and field athletes from San Diego
University of California, Los Angeles alumni
Athletes (track and field) at the 2010 Commonwealth Games
Athletes (track and field) at the 2011 Pan American Games
African-American male track and field athletes
UCLA Bruins men's track and field athletes
American male middle-distance runners
American male long-distance runners
American male cross country runners
American male marathon runners
American people of Caymanian descent
Caymanian middle-distance runners
Caymanian long-distance runners
Caymanian male athletes
Caymanian marathon runners
21st-century African-American sportspeople
20th-century African-American people